Blaauwberg Nature Reserve was proclaimed a local and provincial nature reserve in 2007. The reserve has views down fynbos slopes, across the city, to seven kilometres of rocky and sandy coastline and the ocean and beyond. The reserve presents itself as one of the few viewpoints in the world from where you can see two proclaimed world heritage sites, namely Table Mountain and Robben Island.

Blaauwberg Nature Reserve conserves three threatened vegetation types: Cape Flats dune strandveld (endangered), Swartland shale renosterveld (critically endangered) and Cape Flats sand fynbos (critically endangered). The rich biodiversity embraces a wetland, 624 plant species, 41 mammal species (including whales, dolphins and seals), 166 bird species, 30 reptile species and four amphibians. The reserve is one of the few City of Cape Town nature reserves where it is possible to find Mystromys albicaudatus (White-tailed Mouse) and Orycteropus afer (Aardvark).

The holotype of Scelotes montispectus (Blaauwberg Dwarf Burrowing Skink) was collected within Blaauwberg Nature Reserve. There is also a population of Mystromys albicaudatus (white-tailed mouse) listed as endangered in the latest Red List of mammals of South Africa, as well as a total of eight Red List fauna species.

Within the current 1,445 ha, there is evidence of early human occupation, with shell middens dating back approximately 15,000 years. The reserve also conserves the site of the 1806 Battle of Blaauwberg, when the British took possession of the Cape from the Dutch for the second time and retained ownership until South Africa’s independence. On Blaauwberg Hill, several buildings were constructed during World War II, including a radar station, a lookout and a mess room.

Since the then Blaauwberg Conservation Area’s (BCA) inception, conservation in the area has progressed rapidly. Simple bollards in the coastal parking areas have stopped 4x4s from accessing and ultimately driving on the beach, and, already, the endangered vegetation has recovered and the Haematopus moquini (African black oystercatcher) has since returned. Illegal vehicles had not only endangered the vegetation and Haematopus moquini, but had destroyed a number of the shell middens.

The conservation area is also used for recreational activities such as surfing, hiking, wind surfing, whale watching and picnics.

See also
 Biodiversity of Cape Town
 List of nature reserves in Cape Town
 Cape Flats Sand Fynbos
 Cape Flats Dune Strandveld 
 Swartland Shale Renosterveld

References

Nature reserves in Cape Town
Protected areas of the Western Cape